North Point Ferry Pier is a ferry pier in North Point, Hong Kong and it is near the site of the former North Point Estate. It started operation in 1963.  In 1979, a second passenger berth opened that is located west of the older one. 

Until 14 May 2016, the large open-air North Point Ferry Pier Bus Terminus was situated immediately inland of the pier, but that has now been relocated one block east, as 'North Point Ferry Pier Public Transport Interchange' under a new building, and a new building is being erected on the old bus station site.

Destinations

References

1957 establishments in Hong Kong
Piers in Hong Kong
North Point
Victoria Harbour